Surekha Kadam is Shiv Sena Politician from Ahmednagar district. She is the current Mayor of Ahmednagar.

Positions held
 2012: Elected as corporator in Ahmednagar Municipal Corporation
 2016: Elected as Mayor of Ahmednagar Municipal Corporation in 2016

References

External links
 Shivsena Home Page
 Ahmednagar Municipal Corporation website

Living people
Marathi politicians
Maharashtra local politicians
Shiv Sena politicians
Year of birth missing (living people)
People from Ahmednagar